The 1971–72 Liga Femenina de Baloncesto was the 9th edition of the Spanish premier women's basketball championship. It took place from 17 October 1971 to 26 March 1972. Twelve teams took part in the championship and Ignis Mataró won its first title. Medina La Coruña was relegated.

Regular season

Results

Promotion

References
Hispaligas

External links
Official website

Femenina
Liga Femenina de Baloncesto seasons
Spain
Spain